John P. Sommers House is a historic home located at Lancaster in Erie County, New York.  It was built in 1906, and is a -story, wood-frame Queen Anne style dwelling.  It has a hipped roof and center projecting gable.  It features a prominent two-story, five-sided corner tower and has a single-story porch across the front facade.

It was added to the National Register of Historic Places in 2012.

References

Houses on the National Register of Historic Places in New York (state)
Queen Anne architecture in New York (state)
Houses completed in 1906
Houses in Erie County, New York
National Register of Historic Places in Erie County, New York
1906 establishments in New York (state)